Fingerling or Fingerlings may refer to:

 Fingerling (fish), the development stage of young fish at which the fins can be extended and scales started developing
 Fingerlings (toy), line of robotic toys
 Fingerling potato, a small potato
 Fingerling, a musical measurement

Fiction
Pinkeltje, translated as "Fingerling", a finger-sized gnome character in 1939-1977 children's books by Dutch writer Dick Laan
Pinkeltje (film), a 1978 Dutch film based on the book series
Detective Fingerling, a character in The Number 23

Music
Fingerlings (album), by Andrew Bird
Winged Eel Fingerling, guitarist

See also
 Fingering (disambiguation)